Bo Magnus Andersson (born 26 August 1968), known as "Bosse" Andersson, or simply "Super-Bosse" is a Swedish businessman and former professional footballer who played as a forward. He is director of sports at Djurgårdens IF.

Playing career
Bo Andersson played for BK Vargarna, Väsby IK, AIK, Vasalunds IF, Djurgårdens IF, and SC Braga. In the 1994 and 1995 Djurgårdens IF seasons, he was the internal top scorer.

Post-playing career
Between 1997 and 2008, Andersson was club director at Djurgårdens IF. Since 2013, he is back as director of sports at Djurgårdens IF. 

Bosse Andersson has achieved legendary status among the Djurgården supporters, widely accepted as the most successful director of sports in Sweden. After returning to Djurgården in 2013, working in tandem with CEO Henrik Berggren, he guided the club from near bankruptcy to become Sweden´s third richest club, behind only Malmö FF and IFK Norrköping (2021). Using his wide network of contacts, Bosse has brought several young African players to Europe and Djurgården, and the club has made a fortune after selling these talents to bigger clubs. These include Omar Colley (originally came to Finland), Tino Kadewere, Sam Johnson (originally came to IK Frej), Michael Olunga and Aliou Badji. Selling players to Chinese clubs has been the biggest factor to Bosses success at Djurgården. The club has earned two titles since Bosse´s return.

Honours

Player 

 Djurgårdens IF 
 Division 1 Norra: 1994

Director of football/sports 

 Djurgårdens IF
 Allsvenskan: 2002, 2003, 2005, 2019
 Svenska Cupen: 2002, 2004, 2005, 2017–18
 Superettan: 2000

References

1968 births
Living people
Swedish footballers
Swedish expatriate footballers
Allsvenskan players
Primeira Liga players
BKV Norrtälje players
Väsby IK players
Vasalunds IF players
AIK Fotboll players
Djurgårdens IF Fotboll players
S.C. Braga players
Expatriate footballers in Portugal
Djurgårdens IF Fotboll directors and chairmen
Association football forwards